Last Hero 1 (Posledniy Geroy 1) was the first season of Russian Last Hero reality show, hosted by Sergei Bodrov, Jr.

Contestants

The total votes is the number of votes a castaway has received during Tribal Councils where the castaway is eligible to be voted out of the game. It does not include the votes received during the final Tribal Council.

References

2001 Russian television series debuts
2002 Russian television seasons
Last Hero seasons
2001 Russian television seasons
Television shows filmed in Panama